Odontomyia hunteri is an Australian species of soldier fly in the family Stratiomyidae. The original insect was collected by Captain King. The species was named in honour of the Mermaid's surgeon James Hunter in 1826, by Alexander Macleay.

Distribution
Australia

References

Stratiomyidae
Insects of Australia
Insects described in 1926
Diptera of Australasia
Taxa named by Alexander Macleay